Endendu Ninagagi is a 2014 Indian Kannada-language drama film directed by Mahesh Rao. A remake of the Tamil film Engaeyum Eppothum, it features newcomer Vivek Narasimhan, Deepa Sannidhi, Anish Tejeshwar and Sindhu Lokanath in the lead roles.

Cast
 Vivek Narasimhan as Suri
 Deepa Sannidhi as Soumya
 Anish Tejeshwar as Gowtham
 Sindhu Lokanath as Mathura
 Abhaya Simha
 Rashmi Simha

Critical reception
The Times of India gave it 3 stars out of 5 and called it "a compact film worth watching at least once". The New Indian Express wrote that director Mahesh Rao "tells us a tragic tale of love and fate with great sensitivity and that he has managed to retain much of the melodrama of the original flick in his remake". Sify wrote, "The story and screenplay is definitely impressive and the director has to be credited for sketching the movie in the right way" and called the film "definitely worth a weekend".

Soundtrack

References

External links

2010s Kannada-language films
2014 films
2010s drama road movies
Kannada remakes of Tamil films
Indian drama road movies
Films directed by Mahesh Rao
2014 drama films